The Mizoram Co-operative Apex Bank or Mizoram Apex Bank is an Indian co-operative banking company headquartered in Aizawl. It was incorporated in 1982 as an urban cooperative bank.

History                
Mizoram State Rural Livelihood Mission signed a memorandum of understanding with Mizoram Cooperative Apex Bank on 17February2018 to help self-help groups.

Operation
The Bank has operations in Siaha, Lawngtlai, Lunglei, Champhai, Serchhip, Kolasib, Mamit, Main Branch, Dawrpui Branch, New Market Branch, Bawngkawn Branch and Cooperative Centenary Branch. The Bank currently has 1037share-holder cooperative societies with the  Government of Mizoram  and has a total staff strength of 166employees. The Mizoram Cooperative Apex Bank has given loans to over 11,483people in the state of Mizoram.

References 

Cooperative banks of India
1982 establishments in Mizoram
Banks established in 1982
Companies based in Mizoram